This is a list of notable events in music that took place in the year 1911.

Specific locations
1911 in Norwegian music

Specific genres
1911 in jazz

Events
January 26 – Première of the opera Der Rosenkavalier by Richard Strauss, in Dresden; the librettist is Hugo von Hofmannsthal and the director is Max Reinhardt.
February 21 – Gustav Mahler, who has contracted bacterial endocarditis and is running a fever of 104 degrees, conducts his last concert, with the New York Philharmonic, of which he has been principal conductor since 1909.
April 3 – Jean Sibelius conducts the world première of his Symphony No. 4 in Helsinki.
April 8 – Gustav Mahler embarks from New York for France; he enters a clinic in Paris, where he dies just over a month later.
May 19 – Maurice Ravel's opera L'heure espagnole is premiered at the Opéra-Comique in Paris, in a double bill with Jules Massenet's 1907 opera Thérèse.
May 24 – Edward Elgar conducts the première of his Symphony No. 2 in London.
June 15 – Igor Stravinsky's ballet Petrushka is premiered in Paris; the lead dancer is Vaslav Nijinsky.
July – Frank Bridge completes his orchestral suite The Sea, while staying at Eastbourne.
November 20 – Gustav Mahler's Das Lied von der Erde is premièred in Munich, after the composer's death, with his friend and former assistant Bruno Walter conducting at the request of Alma Mahler.
date unknown
Aino Ackté and other prominent opera singers found the Domestic Opera in Finland.
"Elsässisches Fahnenlied" is adopted as the anthem of the Republic of Alsace-Lorraine.
16-year-old Carl Orff publishes his first compositions.
The Society of Women Musicians is co-founded by Marion Scott and others.

Published popular music
 "After That I Want A Little More" w. Alfred Bryan m. Fred Fisher
 "After The Honeymoon" w.m. Irving Berlin
 "Alexander's Ragtime Band" w.m. Irving Berlin
 "All Alone" w. William Dillon m. Harry Von Tilzer
 "Any Old Iron" w.m. Charles Collins & Terry Sheppard
 "Archibald, Certainly Not" w.m. Alfred Glover & John St John
 "Baby Rose" by Louis Weslyn
 "Billy" w. Joe Goodwin m. James Kendis & Herman Paley
 "Bring Back My Lovin' Man" w.m. Irving Berlin
 "Can't You Take It Back And Change It For A Boy?" w.m. Thurland Chattaway
 "Core 'ngrato" w. Riccardo Cordiferro, m. Salvatore Cardillo
 "Daly's Reel" m. Joseph M. Daly
 "Down Home Rag" m. Wilbur Sweatman
 "Down The Field" w. Caleb O'Connor m. Stanleigh P. Friedman
 "El Choclo" w. Francice Luban m. Angel G. Villoldo
 "Everybody's Doing it Now" w.m. Irving Berlin
 "The Firebird" m. Igor Stravinsky
 "The Floral Dance" w.m. Katie Moss
 "The Gaby Glide" w. Harry Pilcer m. Louis Hirsch
 "Hello! Susie Green" w. Lester Barrett m. Herman Darewski
 "Honey Love" w. Jack Drislane m. George W. Meyer
 "Honeysuckle Rag" m. George Botsford
 "I Want a Girl (Just Like the Girl That Married Dear Old Dad)" w. William Dillon m. Harry Von Tilzer
 "I Want To Be In Dixie" (also known as ""I'm Going Back To Dixie") w.m. Irving Berlin & Ted Snyder
 "If Every Hour Were A Day" w. Anna Driver m. Alfred Bryan
 "In The Land Of Harmony" w. Bert Kalmar m. Ted Snyder
 "It's A Long Lane That Has No Turning" w. Arthur Penn m. Manuel Klein
 "Jimmy Valentine" w. Edward Madden m. Gus Edwards
 "The Little Grey Home In The West" w. D. Eardley-Wilmot m. Hermann Löhr
 "Love Is Mine" w. Edward Teschemacher m. Clarence G. Gartner
 "Make Me Love You Like I Never Loved Before" w. Alfred Bryan m. Fred Fisher
 "Mary O'Hoolihan" Berlin
 "(On) Moonlight Bay" w. Edward Madden m. Percy Wenrich
 "Movin' Man Don't Take My Baby Grand" w. Bert Kalmar m. Ted Snyder
 "My Beautiful Lady (Kiss Waltz)" w. C. M. S. McLellan m. Ivan Caryll
 "My Hula Hula Love" w. Edward Madden m. Percy Wenrich
 "My Rosary Of Dreams" w.m. E. F. Dusenberg & C. M. Denison

 "Naughty, Naughty, Naughty" w. Harry Williams m. Egbert Van Alstyne
 "The Oceana Roll" w. Roger Lewis m. Lucien Denni
 "Oh Baby Mine" w.m. Cecille Boucher
 "Oh, You Beautiful Doll" w. A. Seymour Brown m. Nat D. Ayer
 "One O'Clock In The Morning I Get Lonesome" w.m. Irving Berlin
 "Ragtime Violin!" w.m. Irving Berlin
 "Red Rose Rag" w. Edward Madden m. Percy Wenrich
 "A Ring On The Finger Is Worth Two On The Phone" w. Jack Mahoney m. George W. Meyer
 "Roamin' In The Gloamin'" w.m. Harry Lauder
 "Run Home And Tell Your Mother" w.m. Irving Berlin
 "Sarnia Cherie" (anthem of Guernsey) w. George Deighton, m. Domenico Santangelo 
 "Somewhere a Voice is Calling" w. Eileen Newton m. Arthur F. Tate
 "The Spaniard That Blighted My Life" w.m. Billy Merson
 "Spanish Love" Irving Berlin, Vincent Bryan, Ted Snyder
 "Texas Tommy Swing" Sid Brown & Val Harris
 "That Baboon Baby Dance" w. Dave Oppenheim m. Joe Cooper
 "That Hypnotizing Man" w. Lew Brown m. Albert Von Tilzer
 "That Mysterious Rag" w.m. Irving Berlin, Ted Snyder
 "That Was Before I Met You" w. Alfred Bryan m. George W. Meyer
 "There's A Girl In Havana" Irving Berlin, E. Ray Goetz, A. Baldwin Sloane
 "They Always Pick On Me" by Harry Von Tilzer and Stanley Murphy
 "Till The Sands Of The Desert Grow Cold" w. George Graff Jr m. Ernest R. Ball
 "To The Land Of My Own Romance" w. Harry B. Smith m. Victor Herbert
 "Too Much Mustard" m. Cecil Macklin
 "Virginia Lou" Irving Berlin, Earl Taylor
 "A Wee Deoch-an-Doris" w.m. Gerald Grafton & Harry Lauder
 "When I Was Twenty-One And You Were Sweet Sixteen" w. Harry Williams m. Egbert Van Alstyne
 "When I'm Alone I'm Lonesome" w.m. Irving Berlin & Ted Snyder
 "When It Rains, Sweetheart, When It Rains" w.m. Irving Berlin
 "When Ragtime Rosie Ragged The Rosary" w. Edgar Leslie m. Lewis F. Muir
 "When You Kiss An Italian Girl" w.m. Irving Berlin
 "When You're Away" w. A. Seymour Brown & Joe Young m. Bert Grant
 "When You're In Town" w.m. Irving Berlin
 "The Whistling Rag" w.m. Irving Berlin
 "Woodman, Woodman, Spare That Tree" w.m. Irving Berlin & Vincent Bryan
 "Yiddisha Nightingale" w.m. Irving Berlin
 "You've Got Me Hypnotized" w.m. Irving Berlin

Hit recordings
 "Any Little Girl, That's a Nice Little Girl, Is the Right Little Girl for Me" – Billy Murray
 "Let Me Call You Sweetheart" - the Peerless Quartet
 "Turn Off Your Light, Mr. Moon Man" – Nora Bayes and Jack Norworth

Classical music
Joseph Achron – Hebrew Melody
Lili Boulanger – Les Sirènes
Frank Bridge – The Sea
George Butterworth – Two English Idylls
George Whitefield Chadwick – Suite Symphonique
Eric Coates – Miniature Suite
Frederick Delius – Summer Night on the River
George Enescu –
Sonata for violin and piano, in A minor (first-movement "Torso")
Suite châtelaine, for orchestra (unfinished)
Carl Engel – Sea-Shell
Reinhold Glière – Symphony No. 3 Ilya Murometz (completed)
Enrique Granados – Goyescas
Reynaldo Hahn – Aubade athénienne
Gustav Holst 
Invocation for Cello and Orchestra, Op. 19/2
Second Suite in F, for military band
2 Eastern Pictures, H. 112
Charles Ives – Requiem S. 333
Paul von Klenau – String Quartet No. 1 in E minor
Nikolai Medtner – Sonata for Piano in E minor, Op. 25 no 2 "Night Wind"
Nikolai Myaskovsky
Sinfonietta in A
Symphony No. 2
Cello Sonata No. 1 (later revised in 1945).
Carl Nielsen – Concerto for Violin and Orchestra
Arnold Schoenberg – Sechs kleine Klavierstücke
Alexander Scriabin
Piano Sonata No. 6
Piano Sonata No. 7
Cyril Scott 
An Old Song Ended
Water-Wagtail, Op.71 No.3
Tallahassee, Op.73 No.4
Ethel Smyth – The March of the Women
John Philip Sousa – Tales of a Traveler
Charles Villiers Stanford
Symphony No. 7 in D minor, Op. 124
Piano Concerto No. 2 in C minor, Op. 126
Igor Stravinsky
The Firebird Suite No. 1
Petrushka
Two Poems of K. Balmont, for voice and piano
Amy Woodforde-Finden – "Stars of the Desert"

Opera
Béla Bartók – Bluebeard's Castle (first version composed; revised 1912 and 1917; not staged until 1918)
Scott Joplin – Treemonisha (composed; not staged until 1972)
Maurice Ravel – L'Heure Espagnole
Richard Strauss – Der Rosenkavalier, Dresden

Operetta
 Leányvásár (The Marriage Market) – Victor Jacobi

Musical theater
 The Count of Luxembourg London production opened at Daly's Theatre on May 20 and ran for 340 performances
 The Fascinating Widow Broadway production opened at the Liberty Theatre on September 11 and transferred to the Grand Opera House on November 13 for a total run of 65 performances.  Starring Julian Eltinge, Winona Winter, Natalia Ault and Eddie Garvie.
 Gypsy Love (Zigeunerliebe) opened in Berlin.  The Broadway production opened at the Globe Theatre on October 17 and ran for 31 performances
 Der Lila Domino (Lilac Domino) – Leipzig production
 Madame Sherry New York
 Marriage a la Carte Broadway production opened at the Casino Theatre on January 2 and ran for 64 performances
 Peggy, by Leslie Stuart, with a book by George Grossmith, Jr. and lyrics by C. H. Bovill, London production opens at the Gaiety Theatre under the management of George Edwardes, on 4 March, and runs for 270 performances, starring Grossmith, Edmund Payne, Phyllis Dare and Gabrielle Ray
 The Pink Lady Broadway production opened at the New Amsterdam Theatre on March 13 and ran for 312 performances
 The Quaker Girl Broadway production opened at the Park Theatre on October 23 and ran for 240 performances
 The Revue of Revues Broadway revue opened at the Winter Garden Theatre on September 27 and ran for 55 performances.  Starring Gaby Deslys, Harry Jolson, Ernie Hare and Frank Tinney.
 Die Sirene by Leo Fall, based on a text by Leo Stein and A. M. Willner, first performed in Vienna on 5 January.
 The Siren, a Broadway musical adaptation of Die Sirene is produced in New York by Charles Frohman and runs at the Knickerbocker Theatre from 28 August 1911 to 16 December (116 performances).

Births
January 10 – Sidney Griller, violinist and founder of the Griller Quartet (d. 1993)
January 18 
Gábor Darvas, composer (d. 1985)
Danny Kaye, actor, singer, dancer and comedian (d. 1987)
January 20
Roy Eldridge, jazz musician (d. 1989)
Wendell J. Westcott, American carillon player and educator (d. 2010)
January 24 
Evelyn Barbirolli, English oboist (d. 2008)
Muir Mathieson, Scottish conductor and composer (d. 1975)
February 3 – Jehan Alain, organist and composer (d. 1940)
February 5 – Jussi Björling, Swedish tenor (d. 1960)
February 11 – Wesley Rose, record producer (d. 1990)
February 17 – Orrin Tucker, American saxophonist and bandleader (d. 2011)
February 20 – Robert McBride, composer (d. 2007)
March 7 – Stefan Kisielewski, Polish composer (d. 1991)
March 8 – Alan Hovhaness, composer (d. 2000)
March 9 – Clara Rockmore, born Clara Reisenberg, thereminist and violinist (d. 1998)
March 16 – Harper Goff, Disney special effects man and Dixieland musician (d. 1993)
March 18 – Smiley Burnette, singer-songwriter (d. 1967)
April 6 – Guillermo Portabales, singer-songwriter and guitarist (d. 1970)
April 8 – Ichirō Fujiyama, Japanese composer and singer (d. 1993)
May 8 – Robert Johnson, blues guitarist and singer (d. 1938)
May 13 – Maxine Sullivan, singer (d. 1987)
May 14 – Hans Vogt, composer and conductor (d. 1992)
May 18 – Big Joe Turner, blues shouter (d. 1985)
May 20 – Vet Boswell of the Boswell Sisters singing group (d. 1988)
June 4 – Faustino Oramas, Cuban singer, tres guitarist and composer (d. 2007)
June 9 – Frederick May, Irish composer (d. 1985)
June 24 – Portia White, contralto singer (d. 1968)
June 29 – Bernard Herrmann, film composer (d. 1975)
July 4 – Mitch Miller, arranger, conductor, record producer and oboe player (d. 2010)
July 7 – Gian Carlo Menotti, composer (d. 2007)
July 8 – Gertrude Niesen, American singer, actress, comedian and songwriter (d. 1975)
July 16 – Ginger Rogers, dancer, actress and singer (d. 1995)
July 26 – Buddy Clark, singer (d. 1949)
July 29 – Ján Cikker, composer (d. 1989)
July 31 – George Liberace, violinist and elder brother of Liberace (d. 1983)
August 5 – Roger Roger, film composer and bandleader (d. 2007)
August 6 – Lucille Ball, actress and singer (d. 1989)
August 26 – Deva Dassy, French opera singer (d. 2016)
August 27 – Kay Walsh, dancer and actress (d. 2005)
September 2 – Floyd Council, blues musician (d. 1976)
September 11 – Bola de Nieve, singer-songwriter and pianist (d. 1971)
September 19 – Allan Pettersson, Swedish composer (d. 1980)
September 24 – Marie Kraja, Albanian operatic and folk singer (d. 1999)
October 1 – Irwin Kostal, arranger (d. 1994)
October 7
Shura Cherkassky, pianist (d. 1995)
Vaughn Monroe, singer and bandleader (d. 1973)
October 24 – Sonny Terry, blues musician (d. 1986)
October 26 – Mahalia Jackson, gospel singer (d. 1972)
October 29 – Nelson Cavaquinho, samba singer and composer (d. 1986)
November 5 – Roy Rogers, singer, actor (d. 1998)
November 30 – Jorge Negrete, Mexican singer and actor (d. 1953)
December 3 – Nino Rota, composer (d. 1979)
December 14 – Spike Jones, bandleader (d. 1965)
December 15 – Stan Kenton, bandleader (d. 1979)
December 17 – André Claveau, French singer and Eurovision winner (d. 2003)
December 25 – Eric Gilder, musicologist (d. 2000)
December 27 – Anna Russell, singer and comedian (d. 2006)
December 28 – Max Jaffa, violinist and bandleader (d. 1991)
date unknown – Blanche Winogron, harpsichordist (d. 2002)

Deaths
January 7 – William Hall Sherwood, pianist and music educator (b. 1854)
January 8 – Pietro Gori, anarchist poet and songwriter (b. 1865)
January 9 – Edwin Arthur Jones, composer (b. 1853)
January 16 – Wilhelm Berger, pianist, conductor and composer (born 1861)
January 28 – Wilhelmina Fundin, Swedish operatic soprano (b. 1819)  
February 1 – Ángel Mislan, composer (b. 1862)
February 20 – Alexander Kopylov, violinist and composer (b. 1854)
March 20 – Jean-Théodore Radoux, bassoonist and composer (b. 1835)
March 29 – Alexandre Guilmant, organist and composer (b. 1837)
April 7 – Wilhelm Thern, pianist (b. 1847)
April 10 – Mikalojus Konstantinas Čiurlionis, painter and composer (b. 1875)
April 15 – Wilma Neruda, violinist (b. 1838)
May 4 – Ronald Richardson Potter, organist and composer (b. 1879)
May 5 – James A. Bland, musician and songwriter (b. 1854)
May 18 – Gustav Mahler, composer (b. 1860)
May 29 – W. S. Gilbert, of Gilbert & Sullivan (b. 1836)
June 7 – Carlos Fernández Shaw, librettist (b. 1865)
June 13 – Patrick Heeney, composer (b. 1881)
June 14 – Johan Svendsen, conductor, composer and violinist (b. 1840)
June 18 – Franjo Kuhač, piano teacher, conductor and musicologist (b. 1834)
June 21 – Robert Radecke, composer (b. 1830)
June 22 – Bruno Klein, organist and composer (b. 1858)
July 2 – Felix Mottl, conductor and composer (b. 1856)
July 3 – Madeline Schiller, pianist (b. c. 1845)
July 7 – Samuel de Lange, composer, organist, pianist, conductor and music teacher, director of the Stuttgart music conservatory (b. 1841)
July 25 – Filippo Capocci, Italian organist and composer (b. 1840)
August 2
Bob Cole, composer (b. 1869)
José Joaquín Palma, lyricist of the national anthem of Guatemala (b. 1884)
August 10 – Carl Christian Lumbye, Danish composer, son of Hans Christian Lumbye
August 29 – Hildegard Werner, Swedish musician, conductor and journalist (b. 1834)
October 3 – Paul Sarebresole, ragtime composer (b. 1875)
October 13 – Harry Rickards, comedian, singer and theatre owner (b. 1843)
November 23 – Catalina Berroa, Cuban pianist, music teacher and composer (b. 1849)
December 29 – Rosamund Marriott Watson, lyricist (born 1860)

References

 
20th century in music
Music by year